Jessalyn Wanlim (born September 3, 1982) is a Canadian-American actress and model. She played Evie Cho on the science fiction television series Orphan Black, as well as Jenny Matthews on the sitcom Workin' Moms. She had a recurring role in Scoundrels as Patty Hong in five episodes.

Life and career
Wanlim was born and raised in Calgary, Alberta, Canada. She currently resides in Los Angeles, California.

Wanlim started singing in music school, then become a stage actress in her high school's art course. She began acting and landed the recurring role of Rachael, the nanny to Kendall and Zach, in the television series All My Children, appearing in nearly fifty episodes of the series from 2006 to 2009. During her time on All My Children, Wanlim also appeared as Pauletta Cho in three episodes of Gossip Girl.

She began starring as Jenny Matthews on the CBC sitcom Workin' Moms as a main role in 2017, but was demoted to a recurring role for the second season. She returned as a starring character starting season three and remained until 2023, the seventh and final season.

Filmography

Film

Television

References

External links

Canadian people of American descent
Canadian people of Chinese descent
Canadian actresses of Filipino descent
Canadian film actresses
Canadian television actresses
1982 births
Living people
Actresses from Calgary